The Massachusett Tribe at Ponkapoag is a cultural heritage group that claims descendancy from the Massachusett people, an Indigenous people of the Northeastern Woodlands.

While they identify as a Native American tribe, they are unrecognized, meaning they are neither a federally recognized tribe nor a state-recognized tribe.

Nonprofit organizations 
The Massachuset-Ponkapoag Tribal Council, Inc. is a 501(c)(3) nonprofit organization established in 2002; however, GuideStar reports that their nonprofit status was revoked for failing to file 990 tax forms with the IRS for three consecutive years. As a cultural awareness organization, their stated mission is "The Education of the Massachuset people in our history, customs and culture." Gilbert Solomon is the principal officer, based in Bridgewater, Massachusetts. Their agent is Masschusetts Registered Agent, LLC.

The Ponkapoag Land Corporation is an active nonprofit organization, also founded in 2002 with Gilbert Solomon serving as agent. Its registered address is in Holliston, Massachusetts.

Officers 
The officers of the Massachuset-Ponkapoag Tribal Council, Inc., and Ponkapoag Land Corporation are as follows:
 Gilbert Solomon, president
 Thomas Green, vice president
 Elizabeth Solomon, treasurer
 Alysha Gray, clerk.

Robin Harris became the director of the Massachusetts-Ponkapoag Tribal Council, Inc. in 2021. Jean Oliver Foster became director of the Ponkapoag Land Corporation in 2021.

Activities 
As the Massachusett Tribe at Ponkapoag, the organization released an open letter in 2020 opposing the use of Native American sports mascots. Members participated in the Wessagussett Wetlands and Woodlands site's unveiling of public signage of local history in Weymouth, Massachusetts. The Massachusett Tribe at Ponkapoag has publicly called on Boston University to rename its Myles Standish Hall to Wituwamat Memorial Hall after a Neponset tribal member killed by colonists in 1623.

See also 
 Praying Indians of Natick and Ponkapoag
 List of unrecognized tribes in the United States

References

External links 
 The Massachusett Tribe at Ponkapoag

Native American rights organizations
Non-profit organizations based in Massachusetts
Organizations established in 2002
Organizations based in Massachusetts
Unrecognized tribes in the United States